Ruby Foo Wong 
( better known as Ruby Foo, was a restaurateur who founded the historic Ruby Foo's Den in Boston in 1929. One of the earliest Chinese-American women restaurant owners, she went on to open similar restaurants in New York, Miami, Washington, and Providence.

Biography

Ruby Foo was born in San Francisco in 1904. In 1923, she moved to Boston, where she started a one-room restaurant in Chinatown. The venture was a success, and in 1929 she opened Ruby Foo's Den, a restaurant and nightclub, at 6 Hudson Street. Billed as "Chinatown's smartest restaurant", the "Den" was the first known Chinese restaurant in the U.S. to attract a large non-Chinese clientele. In the 1930s and 40s it was a nationally known gathering place for famous athletes, actors, and other celebrities. It became one of the first Boston restaurants to expand into other cities when Foo lent her name to similar establishments in New York City, Miami, Washington D.C., Providence, and Montreal. Foo was a mentor to many aspiring chefs in the Boston area.

Foo was married three times and had two children, Earl and Doris Shong. Her third husband was William Wong. According to the Boston Globe, after seeing the famous "Bloody Saturday" photograph of a crying baby in a bombed-out Shanghai railway station, she arranged to have the baby brought to the U.S., where she adopted him in 1938, naming him Ronald.

Foo died of a heart attack in her Jamaicaway home on March 16, 1950, . Her funeral was attended by prominent city and state officials, as well as "stage, screen, and radio personalities". She is commemorated on the Boston Women's Heritage Trail.

References

External links 

 Photo: Ruby Foo's in Boston, 1951.
 Photo: Ruby Foo's Den, 240 W. 52nd St. (West of Broadway) New York, ca. 1945 
 Photo: 1937 menu
 

1904 births
1950 deaths
History of Boston
Asian-American culture in Boston
People from San Francisco
American women restaurateurs
American restaurateurs
American people of Chinese descent
American women in business
People from Jamaica Plain
20th-century American women